"Elevator Love Letter" is the nineteenth episode of the fifth season of the American television medical drama, Grey's Anatomy and the show's 97th episode overall. Written by Stacy McKee and directed by Edward Ornelas, the episode was originally broadcast on the American Broadcasting Company (ABC) in the United States on March 26, 2009. It was viewed by 15.81 million people and garnered a 5.5/13 Nielsen rating/share in the 18–49 demographic. Sandra Oh received a Primetime Emmy Award nomination for Outstanding Supporting Actress in a Drama Series for her portrayal of Cristina Yang in this episode.

In this episode, Derek Shepherd (Patrick Dempsey) proposes to the show's title character Meredith Grey (Ellen Pompeo) while Izzie Stevens (Katherine Heigl) undergoes surgery for cancer with Alex Karev (Justin Chambers) feeling guilty for her condition. Cristina Yang (Sandra Oh) deals with the PTSD of her boyfriend and fellow surgeon Owen Hunt (Kevin McKidd). The episode received favorable reviews with critics calling it a payoff for Meredith and Derek fans.

The storyline involving Izzie's embryos is picked up again in the  season 12 episode, "I Choose You" and subsequently concludes on the season 16 episode, "Leave A Light On".

Plot
Cristina and Owen are finally spending nights with each other, relaxing by watching videos of surgeries. Cristina falls asleep, so Owen turns the TV off and shuts off the lights. He dozes off, and the peppy, happy music stops, replaced by whooshing sounds of the overhead ceiling fan turning in slow motion. The screen goes dark and the next thing we know, Owen is choking Cristina. She struggles but can't free herself. Callie walks through the door to see if everything OK, and stops him.

At work, Cristina is wearing a turtleneck to cover up her neck bruises. Meredith doesn't want Cristina to cover for Owen because neither of them are okay. George is upset that Izzie didn't tell him about her illness. He doesn't want to think about it, so he asks Callie if he can be on her service that day in order to avoid thinking about her. Bailey greets the residents before they go into Izzie's room. She reminds them all that Izzie needs them to be friends and not doctors now. Izzie knits and reminds them that they have other patients and tells them to go save lives.

Derek asks Alex, as Izzie's boyfriend, if he has any questions before her brain surgery today but he doesn't say much. Later, Richard awkwardly asks Alex whether he wants to produce a sperm sample because they are harvesting Izzie's eggs prior to radiation to which he  immediately agrees. Mark's patient is an aging woman unlikely to make it through the day. But her nephews and niece are anxious to catch flights and can't be bothered to stick around until she dies.

Owen and Derek go to the roof of the hospital to receive a head trauma patient who was helicoptered in. The sound of the helicopter makes Owen freeze up for a moment until Derek snaps him out of it. Outside the hospital, Derek reminds Owen that PTSD is a real injury that produces real physiological changes, but it can also be healed.

Meredith tries to walk into an empty elevator, but Richard stands in front of the door, blocking her way, until that elevator closes and the other one opens. Derek is in the elevator! He has plastered the walls of the elevator with MRI scans of all of the successful surgeries they have had together. He points out certain surgeries, like the first one they scrubbed in on together, or the one when he first realized she would become a great surgeon, and the one he just performed on Izzie for which Meredith believed in him. He tells her that she doesn't freeze. She's seen the worst and has been through the worst, but that is how she has the strength to help everyone through their times of hardship. Her dark and twistiness is a virtue, not a flaw. He doesn't get down on one knee. He doesn't ask any questions. He simply says that he loves her and wants to spend the rest of his life with her. Meredith kisses him.

Reception

The episode was originally broadcast on the American Broadcasting Company (ABC) in the United States on March 26, 2009.  The initial airing in the United States was viewed by 15.326 million people and garnered a Nielsen rating/share in the 18–49 demographic.

PopSugar called the episode classic Grey's, ""People are better than no people" is such a classic Grey's line, and I loved the old woman who just wouldn't die." and added , "Also love Karev delivering his cup to the Chief in the middle of lunch." The site also liked Derek's proposal saying, "It's not the proposal I was expecting from Derek, but I actually like it better than a room full of roses and candles.", also praising Chandra Wilson's character adding, "Bailey rocks my world, especially with her new-new hairstyle."

Alan Sepinwall lauded the episode saying, "Okay, the series is on a real roll right now. I can't really forgive the ghost sex or the interns starring in their own David Cronenberg movie, but if the rest of the season is as good as the last few episodes have been, I can at least try to forget that stuff." He also lauded Kevin McKidd and Sandra Oh saying, "Seeing her flail around, or some sort of insane look on his face, would have made the scene feel over-the-top and cheesy; And after being stuck on the sideline for too much of this season, McKidd and Oh are killing right now." About the proposal he gave a positive review as well saying, "I thought Derek's proposal -- and Meredith's behavior in response to his earlier attempts -- was very grown-up and sweet, and reflected a relationship that's grown to be about more than the stupid will-they-or-won't-they drama. And the moment when Derek finally came out of his stupor and started telling off the oncologist was well-played by Patrick Dempsey, who's been doing some nice work."

Justin Chambers also received praise from Sepinwall, "Every time I watch Justin Chambers get a showcase episode like this, I think about how lucky he is -- and we are -- that the Cold Case producers decided to can him after a few episodes, which allowed him to land this more demanding, high-profile gig."

BuddyTV lauded the proposal scene saying, "Squeee! OMG. I usually don't gush over grand romantic gestures or anything because I have a stone-cold heart, but this is quite possibly the most perfect proposal ever." Cinema Blend also gave largely positive review, "What an incredibly emotionally heavy episode! This really could have been a season finale, it was so packed with emotion, conflict, and resolution." also liked the proposal, "After realizing that Meredith wasn't saying no because she didn't want to be with him, but rather because she wanted a proposal for the right reasons and the right way. He gives her a speech about each of them, and then ties it up by pointing out when he realized certain things, culminating in when he knew he couldn't live without her and wants to spend the rest of his life with her. It was a great speech and proposal, and Meredith finally says yes."

Wired added the episode in its must watch list stating, " If you did happen to endure the Meredith/McDreamy roller coaster of Season 4, this episode is your payoff. Also, former army surgeon Owen’s PTSD causes him to choke Cristina while she sleeps."

References

External links
 

Grey's Anatomy (season 5) episodes
2009 American television episodes